Kyiv Naval Political College was a State military institution of higher education. It was the only school in the whole Soviet Union that was preparing political commissars for the Soviet Navy.

The college was established on 21 January 1967 by Central Committee of the Communist Party of the Soviet Union. In 1948 to 1957 there existed Kyiv Naval Political School. The institution was located in the building that used to be a headquarters of the Soviet Dnieper Flotilla which in turn took it away from the Kiev Theological Academy.

In 1995 the college was closed and dissolved. Its building was transferred to the newly established National University of Kyiv-Mohyla Academy that claims to be a descendant of the Old Kyiv Mohyla Academy (1632-1817).

The mosaic with the college's symbol was preserved by the administration of new university. It contains two quotes of the Soviet Union and Communist leader, Vladimir Lenin: "Study, study, study..." and "Party is brains, honor and conscience of our epoch".

See also
Lenin Military-Political Academy

External links
Alumni's website

1967 establishments in Ukraine
1995 disestablishments in Ukraine
Military academies of the Soviet Union
Defunct universities and colleges in Kyiv
Educational institutions established in 1967
Educational institutions disestablished in 1995
Soviet Navy
Military education and training in Ukraine
Political-Military Educational Institutions